William Vint (30 June 1851 – 28 March 1897) was an Australian cricketer. He played one first-class cricket match for Victoria in 1885.

See also
 List of Victoria first-class cricketers

References

External links
 

1851 births
1897 deaths
Australian cricketers
Victoria cricketers
Cricketers from Belfast